Octavian Popescu (born 25 April 1938) is a Romanian former footballer and coach known in Germany and Turkey as Popi or Pope.

Popescu is a former DFB coach from Sports University in Cologne. He is one of the founders of the IFTA International Footballtennis Association.

Career
Born in Bucharest, Popescu started playing football for FC Rapid București. He joined Ştiinţa Cluj before moving to FC Dinamo București, where he would win three consecutive Romanian league championships with the club from 1963 to 1965. He also played for CS Jiul Petroşani before returning to FC Rapid București in 1968.

Popescu next moved to Turkey to join Mersin İdmanyurdu SK. He made 30 appearances in the Süper Lig during the 1969–70 and 1970–71 seasons.

He made one appearance for the Romania in which he scored in a friendly 2–1 win against the Yugoslavia in 1964.

Following the end of his playing career, Popescu managed a few clubs in Romania and Turkey including Eskişehirspor, and the Romanian Olympic team before he moved to Germany where he studied at the Sports Academy of Cologne which is now called the Hennes Weisweiler Academy. He was appointed manager of TSV 1860 München Malatyaspor and Offenburger FV in 1991.

In 2014, Popescu was among the candidates for the Romanian FA presidency.

References

External links
 
 

1938 births
Living people
Romanian footballers
Romania international footballers
Footballers from Bucharest
FC Rapid București players
FC Universitatea Cluj players
FC Dinamo București players
CSM Jiul Petroșani players
Mersin İdman Yurdu footballers
Romanian football managers
AFC Dacia Unirea Brăila managers
Eskişehirspor managers
TSV 1860 Munich managers
Mersin İdman Yurdu managers
Malatyaspor managers
Süper Lig players
Süper Lig managers
Romanian expatriate sportspeople in Turkey
Romanian expatriate sportspeople in West Germany
Expatriate football managers in Turkey
Expatriate football managers in West Germany
Romanian expatriate football managers
Expatriate footballers in Turkey
Offenburger FV managers
Association football midfielders